Nyanga High School, Marist Brothers also shortly known as 'Marist Nyanga', is a Catholic, independent, boarding, high school located in the Nyanga District of Zimbabwe’s Manicaland, 32 kilometres  from  Nyanga town. Marist Nyanga has a student population of about 550 pupils.

History

In 2016, the school's quiz team won first place in National School Quiz Championship contest held in Johannesburg, with 23 schools from South Africa, Botswana, Zambia and Zimbabwe participating.

Houses

Like most high schools in Zimbabwe, which follow the traditional British school system, students at Marist Nyanga are divided into four houses each having its own colour:

 Champagnat (Red), named after Saint Marcellin Champagnat, the founder of the Marist movement.
 Michael (Yellow), named after the Arch-angel Michael
 Patrick    (Green), named after Saint Patrick
 Kizito    (Blue)

See also
 List of schools in Zimbabwe
 List of boarding schools
 List of Marist Brothers schools

References

Marist Brothers schools in Zimbabwe
High schools in Zimbabwe
Nyanga District
Education in Manicaland Province
Educational institutions established in 1962
1962 establishments in Southern Rhodesia
Boarding schools in Zimbabwe